The 2009 Coke Zero 400 Powered by Coca-Cola was the eighteenth race of the 2009 NASCAR Sprint Cup schedule, marking the halfway point of the season, and the third of four restrictor plate races on the season slate. The 160 lap,  event was held on Saturday night, July 4 (Independence Day in the USA) at the  Daytona International Speedway in Daytona Beach, Florida. The race was broadcast on TNT with pre-race activities beginning at 6:30 PM US EDT, and radio being handled by Sirius XM Radio (satellite) and MRN (over-the-air) starting at 7 PM US EDT. The green flag waved shortly after 8:15 PM US EDT in front of a live audience of 115,000 people with the checkered flag coming out sometime after 11:08 PM US EDT.

Historic date
This marked the first time that the race was run on Independence Day since 1992. The 1998 event, which was to have been run on Independence Day, was postponed due to the wildfires in Florida that year and was raced in October. The event also commemorated the 25th Anniversary to the date of Richard Petty's 200th – and final – victory in this race in 1984. Before 1988, the race had always been held on the morning of the birthdate of the United States; since then, it has been held on the Saturday night closest to the Independence Day.

Background 
 A Federal judge in Charlotte gave a restraining order to Jeremy Mayfield following his appeal of overturning his drug test suspension announced at Darlington before the Southern 500. However, he missed the inspection deadline; it was not clear if he would become a replacement driver in case of an emergency.
 The first 25 nominees for the Charter Class of the NASCAR Hall of Fame were announced. Among them are former Series champions Bobby Allison and Darrell Waltrip, who were the first two nominees announced two days before the formal announcement. A 49-member panel and the fans will select the five enshrinees from those 25 in October, and will be formally inducted during All-Star Race XXVI weekend. Among the other 23 finalists are circuit founder Bill France Sr. and his son, Dale Earnhardt and Richard Petty (who was also nominated along with his father, Lee), the only seven-time winners of the Sprint Cup Series, along with owner Richard Childress, and Benny Parsons and Ned Jarrett, who like Waltrip, both had successful broadcasting careers after retiring as a driver.

Qualifying
Qualifying was rained out for the second straight weekend, so again, the NASCAR rulebook was used to set the order of the field, and Tony Stewart would be on the pole.

Max Papis and the Germain Racing Toyota team and Mike Wallace and the Gunselman Motorsports Toyota team would miss the show.

Race recap
The invocation and the national anthem were preempted in favor of the trailer for the movie G.I. Joe: The Rise of Cobra, causing an outrage among NASCAR fans. The first big one happened in the second half of the race, when Kasey Kahne got into David Stremme, bouncing him off the wall and collecting at least a dozen cars.

Tony Stewart led the most laps, with Denny Hamlin leading the second-most, combining to lead all but eleven of the 160 laps. Like the prior super speedway race at Talladega, a car was wrecked on the last lap. Kyle Busch ended up being the victim of this wreck. Tony Stewart and Kyle Busch made contact, sending Busch spinning hard into the outside wall. After hitting the wall, Busch was rammed hard from behind by Kasey Kahne, destroying Busch's in-car camera. He then was hit hard by his teammate, Joey Logano, on the driver's side.

At least a dozen cars wrecked before and after the start/finish line as the race officially ended under caution, with Stewart picking up his second points race victory of the 2009 season, extending his points lead over Jeff Gordon by 180 points. Eight cautions were handed out by NASCAR officials for a duration of 30 laps; the average green flag run was approximately 14 laps.

Instantly after stopping a stunned, dazed, irritated, impatient Kyle Busch climbed out of his car and tried to follow Tony to victory lane for confrontation but was led away by officials. In victory lane Tony Stewart was unexcited on his victory. He said with a disappointed tone, "Well... I am not proud of what I did back there. I went where I had to go and he went where he had to go. I got into the back of him without thinking... I don't like winning 'em like that. I wish I could enjoy my win but it does not feel good when you have a good day and you wreck someone out of a good day, especially how Kyle helped me the whole race. You want him to have a good day too, and I couldn't just give the win to him so I tried to make my move, he went up to block us and I was already there. I am sorry. I may be too hard on myself but I do not feel like I am... I am sorry but I am thankful for my nice Stewart-Haas Racing team who brought me here today."

When Kyle Busch's friend/boss Joe Gibbs was asked about the finish he said, "I think Kyle did good today. The fact that he gave it all he could and was willing to get us to victory lane shows a true winner in him." Kyle contended that his friend intentionally crashed him but changed his mind in 2010 after a talk with Tony and deciding it was best to put it behind them.

Results

Failed to Qualify
13 - Max Papis
64 - Mike Wallace (withdrew)

References

Coke Zero 400
Coke Zero 400
NASCAR races at Daytona International Speedway
July 2009 sports events in the United States